Mi Vida... My Life is the first compilation album by Puerto Rican reggaeton duo Wisin & Yandel, released on October 21, 2003, by Lideres Entertainment Group. 2 editions were released with 2 different covers. the 2nd edition featured bonus music videos. This album contains 3 new songs and a intro while the rest are songs from other Reggaeton albums.

Track listing

My Life: The Movie

On March 22, 2005, the duo released a compilation album titled Mi Vida: La Película (English: My Life: The Movie). It contained 9 tracks and a DVD of a movie with the same name. The film was based on the early days of their music careers.

Charts

References

Wisin & Yandel albums
2003 albums
Albums produced by Luny Tunes